Tonic tensor tympani syndrome is a disease of the tensor tympani muscle, described by Klochoff et al in 1971.  It involves a decrease in the contraction threshold of the tensor tympani. This hypercontraction (or spasms) leads to chronic ear pain, in particular in the case of hyperacusis and acoustic shock.

Symptoms 
Symptoms include a sensation of fullness in the ear, otalgia, tinnitus, dysacusis, tension headache and vertigo.

References

Diseases of the ear and mastoid process
Syndromes affecting hearing